The 2015 Angola Basketball Super Cup (22nd edition) was contested by Recreativo do Libolo, as the 2014 league champion and Petro Atlético, the 2014 cup winner. Petro Atlético won its 6th title.

The 2015 Women's Super Cup (20th edition) was contested by Primeiro de Agosto, as the 2014 women's league champion and Interclube, the 2014 cup runner-up. (Primeiro de Agosto won the cup as well). Primeiro de Agosto was the winner, making it is's 7th title.

2015 Men's Super Cup

2015 Women's Super Cup

See also
 2015 Angola Basketball Cup
 2015 BIC Basket
 2014 Victorino Cunha Cup

References

Angola Basketball Super Cup seasons
Super Cup
January 2015 sports events in Africa